The Journal of Ayurveda and Integrative Medicine is a peer-reviewed open-access medical journal on ayurvedic medicine. It was established in 2010. The editor-in-chief is Bhushan Patwardhan.

Funding 
The journal is funded by the government of India's Department of Ayurveda, Yoga and Naturopathy, Unani, Siddha and Homoeopathy.

Abstracting and indexing 
The journal is abstracted and indexed in EBSCO Databases, Scopus, and PubMed Central.

References

External links 
 

Medknow Publications academic journals
Alternative and traditional medicine journals
English-language journals
Publications established in 2010